The Manzanar Fishing Club is a documentary film about a fishing club at the Manzanar Relocation Center.

Synopsis 
The documentary is about a fishing club at Manzanar, which was located in the Owens River Valley in California. Fishermen imprisoned in the camp realized that the river nearby was a good place to fish for trout, and they would sneak out regularly to do so.

Criticism 
Many reviewers said that while it was a unique perspective on the internment experience, the film spent a significant amount of time talking about bait, rods, and other gear.

References

External links 

 Official website

American documentary films
2012 films
2012 documentary films
2010s English-language films
2010s American films